Swift Creek may refer to:

Places 
Swift Creek, Georgia, an unincorporated community in DeKalb County, Georgia, U.S.
Swift Creek, North Carolina, an unincorporated community
Swift Creek Township, Wake County, North Carolina

Rivers 
Swift Creek (Western Australia), a watercourse in Western Australia
Swift Creek (Manitoba)
Swift Creek (Ocmulgee River) in Bibb County, Georgia, U.S.
Swift Creek (Virginia)
Swift Creek (Washington) in Washington state
Swift Creek (Wyoming)

Others 
Battle of Swift Creek (1864), a battle fought in Virginia during the American Civil War
Swift Creek culture, an archaeological culture in North America
Swift Creek Middle School, a school in Florida

See also 
Swifts Creek, a town in Australia